Huxford is a surname. Notable people with the surname include:

Cliff Huxford (1937–2018), English footballer and manager
Colin Huxford (born 1944), English footballer
Merchant W. Huxford (1798–1877), American physician and politician
Neville Huxford (1937–2006), New Zealand cricketer
Richard Huxford (born 1969), English footballer
Vanessa Huxford (born 1970), English rugby union player
Walter S. Huxford (1892–1958), American physicist